is a Japanese singer-songwriter. He debuted under the major label BMG Japan in 2006 with the single .

Early life and career 

Hata is the youngest of three brothers. He moved to Yokohama when he was 2. He began playing the guitar at age 3, after his eldest brother received a cheap guitar from a friend. In junior high school, he began writing songs, and after entering high school started working fully as a musician.

In 1999, he performed at his first big concert at the F.A.D Yokohama live house, after a referral by one of his friends.

In 2004, he released an independent EP, . In 2006 he was signed to Augusta Records after catching the attention of one of the staff members. He was the opening act of Augusta Camp 2006 in July. He debuted with the single .

His 2008 single , was his first top 20 hit, reaching No. 15 on Oricon charts. "Kimi, Meguru, Boku" was used as the opening theme for the anime series Itazura na Kiss. Since then, he has had six top 20 singles and two top 10 albums.

In 2010, his song "Tōmei Datta Sekai" premiered as the opening for the seventh season of Naruto: Shippuden.

In 2012 he sang the song "Altair" under the name "Motohiro Hata meets Sakamichi no Apollon" for the ending of the anime Kids on the Slope, which premiered on 12 April 2012.

The song "Goodbye Isaac" was the fourth ending track to the anime Space Brothers.

In 2013, his cover of "Rain" by Senri Oe was featured as the ED for The Garden of Words by Makoto Shinkai.

In 2014, "Himawari no Yakusoku" (ひまわりの約束 Promise of Sunflower) was used as the theme song for the 3D-animated movie Stand by Me Doraemon (STAND BY ME ドラえもん).

Influences 
Hata cited Western artists such as Dua Lipa, Sam Smith, and Taylor Swift among his musical influences.

Discography 

Contrast (2007)
Alright (2008)
Documentary (2010)
Signed Pop (2013)
Ao no Kokei (2015)
 Copernicus (2019)

Awards and nominations 

|-
| 2014
| Motohiro Hata
| Artist of the Year
| 
|}

|-
| 2011
| Documentary
| Sub Grand Prix
| 
|}

|-
| 2014
| Evergreen
| Planning Award
| 
|}

|-
| 2008
| Motohiro Hata
| Best New Artist
| 
|-
| 2009
| "Forever Song"
| Best Male Video
| 
|-
| 2016
| "Sumire"
| Best Male Video
|  
|}

|-
| 2018
| 
| Best Male Artist
| 
|}

References

External links 
 Hata Official Site
 Sony Music Label Site

Living people
Japanese pop musicians
Japanese songwriters
Japanese-language singers
1980 births
People from Miyazaki Prefecture
Musicians from Miyazaki Prefecture
Hosei University alumni
21st-century Japanese singers
21st-century Japanese male singers